Sparsh, the Sanskrit word for "touch", may refer to:

Sparsh (film), a 1980 Indian Hindi film
Sparsh (software), a data-transfer program
Sparsh (festival), an annual cultural festival at Sardar Vallabhbhai National Institute of Technology in Surat, India
Sparsh (album), a 2000 album by Zubeen Garg
Sparsh Khanchandani (born 2000), Indian actress
Sparsh Shah (born 2004), American rapper, singer, and songwriter

See also
Sparśa, a Buddhist term
Sparsha (film), a 1999 Indian Kannada film